Jeremy Freiburghaus (born 30 May 1996) is a Swiss professional golfer who plays on the European Tour. He won the 2022 English Trophy on the Challenge Tour.

Early life and amateur career
Freiburghaus started competing internationally at a young age, and won the 2012 Finnish International Junior. In 2015, he won the Memorial Olivier Barras in Crans-sur-Sierre, a professional tournament.

He represented Switzerland in the European Young Masters, European Boys' Team Championship and European Amateur Team Championship, plus twice in the Eisenhower Trophy.

Professional career
Freiburghaus turned professional in 2019 and joined the Pro Golf Tour. In 2020, he won two events and was runner-up at the Polish Open, and finished 3rd in the Order of Merit to earn promotion to the Challenge Tour.

In 2022, Freiburghaus was runner-up at the Dormy Open and the Scottish Challenge. He claimed his first Challenge Tour title after defeating Max Schmitt in a playoff at the English Trophy. With the win, he moved into the number one position on the Challenge Tour Rankings and ended the seson second in the rankings, behind Nathan Kimsey, to graduate to the European Tour for 2023. 

Freiburghaus became the first Swiss golfer in 20 years to qualify for the European Tour. He made the cut in his first start as a member of the European Tour, at the Joburg Open.

Amateur wins
2012 Finnish International Junior
2017 Northern Amateur Open
2018 Ticino Championship

Source:

Professional wins (4)

Challenge Tour wins (1)

Challenge Tour playoff record (1–1)

Pro Golf Tour wins (2)

Other wins (1)
2015 Memorial Olivier Barras (as an amateur)

Team appearances
Amateur
European Boys' Team Championship (representing Switzerland): 2011, 2012, 2013
European Young Masters (representing Switzerland): 2012
Duke of York Young Champions Trophy (representing Switzerland): 2013
European Amateur Team Championship (representing Switzerland): 2015, 2016, 2017
Eisenhower Trophy (representing Switzerland): 2016, 2018

Source:

See also
2022 Challenge Tour graduates

References

External links

Swiss male golfers
European Tour golfers
Sportspeople from Graubünden
1996 births
Living people